"You and Me" is a 1977 song by Alice Cooper, released in 1977 as the lead single from his album Lace and Whiskey. The song is a soft rock ballad, reaching number nine on the US Billboard Hot 100 and number eight on the Cash Box Top 100 in the summer of 1977. The song reached number three in Canada and number two in Australia, where it is ranked as the 13th biggest hit of 1977.

The song turned out to be Cooper's last US top-ten hit until "Poison" twelve years later.

Cooper regularly performed "You and Me" live on his 1977 and 1978 concert tours. He also performed the song on The Muppet Show in 1978, as a duet with a female monster who turned out to be Miss Piggy.

Chart performance

Weekly charts

Year-end charts

References

External links
 

1977 singles
Songs written by Alice Cooper
Songs written by Dick Wagner
Alice Cooper songs
Song recordings produced by Bob Ezrin
Warner Records singles
American soft rock songs
Rock ballads
1977 songs
1970s ballads